Lewis Martin (November 1, 1895, in San Francisco – February 21, 1969, in Los Angeles) was an American actor.

Lewis Martin made his first Broadway appearance during 1925 in the play Lucky Sam McCarver. His career on Broadway was long and successful, he appeared in over 16 plays between 1925 and 1950. His film and television career started in 1950 with a supporting role in the Kraft Television Theatre. His first film was The Blazing Sun. He played supporting roles in films like The War of the Worlds (as Pastor Collins), The Court Jester (as Sir Finsdale) and Diary of a Madman (as Father Raymonde). Martin often played respectable figures like police officers, military men, judges or priests.

Martin also appeared in numerous television series of the 1950s and 1960s, including Judge Libbott in four episodes of Perry Mason and Professor Henderson in three episodes of The George Burns and Gracie Allen Show. His last role was Commissioner West in two episodes of Tarzan in 1967.

Filmography

 The Blazing Sun (1950) - Engineer (uncredited)
 Experiment Alcatraz (1950) - Asst. District Attorney Walton 
 Counterspy Meets Scotland Yard (1950) - Hugo Borne
 Operation Pacific (1951) - Squad Commander
 Three Guys Named Mike (1951) - C.R. Smith
 Ace in the Hole (1951) - McCardle
 Cattle Drive (1951) - Winston (uncredited)
 Criminal Lawyer (1951) - Judge A.T. Selders (uncredited)
 Drums in the Deep South (1951) - Gen. Johnston
 The Whip Hand (1951) - Peterson
 The Blue Veil (1951) - Archbishop (uncredited)
 The Wild North (1952) - Sergeant
 Red Planet Mars (1952) - Dr. Mitchell - Astronomer (uncredited)
 Sudden Fear (1952) - Bill, the Play Director (uncredited)
 Angel Face (1953) - Police Sergeant (uncredited)
 The War of the Worlds (1953) - Pastor Dr. Matthew Collins
 Pony Express (1953) - Sgt. Russell
 Houdini (1953) - Editor (uncredited)
 Fort Algiers (1953) - Colonel Lasalle
 Vice Squad (1953) - Police Lt. Ed Chisolm
 No Escape (1953) - Police Lt. Bruce Gunning
 Arrowhead (1953) - Col. Weybright
 The Caddy (1953) - Mr. Taylor
 Knock on Wood (1954) - Inspector Cranford
 Witness to Murder (1954) - Psychiatrist
 Prisoner of War (1954) - General (uncredited)
 Men of the Fighting Lady (1954) - Comdr. Michael Coughlin
 Cry Vengeance (1954) - Nick Buda
 Las Vegas Shakedown (1955) - Frank Collins
 The Seven Little Foys (1955) - Episcopal Minister (uncredited)
 Night Freight (1955) - Crane
 The Court Jester (1955) - Sir Finsdale
 The Man Who Knew Too Much (1956) - Detective (uncredited)
 Star in the Dust (1956) - Pastor Harris
 These Wilder Years (1956) - Dr. Miller
 The Quiet Gun (1957) - Steven Hardy
 Slander (1957) - Charles Orrin Sterling
 The Last Stagecoach West (1957) - Ben Hardy
 Rockabilly Baby (1957) - Mayor Howard Hoffman
 Crash Landing (1958) - Maurice Stanley
 Badman's Country (1958) - (uncredited)
 A Summer Place (1959) - Doctor (uncredited)
 The Runaway (1961) - Captain Dawn - U.S. Customs
 Diary of a Madman (1963) - Father Raymonde

External links

1895 births
1974 deaths
20th-century American male actors
American male film actors
American male television actors
Male actors from San Francisco